Darband Khizan (also Romanized as Darband Khīzān; also known as Darreh Khīzān-e ‘Olyā) is a village in Cheleh Rural District, in the Central District of Gilan-e Gharb County, Kermanshah Province, Iran. At the 2006 census, its population was 56, in 9 families.

References 

Populated places in Gilan-e Gharb County